Essential Mixes  may refer to:
 Essential Mixes, a 2010 remix album by Kylie Minogue
 Essential Mixes, a 2010 remix album by Justin Timberlake
 Essential Mixes, a 2010 remix album by Avril Lavigne
 Essential Mixes, a 2010 remix album by Luther Vandross
 Essential Mixes, a 2010 remix album by TLC
 Essential Mixes, a 2010 remix album by Toni Braxton
 Essential Mixes, a 2010 remix album by Usher
 Essential Mixes, a 2010 remix album by R. Kelly
 BBC Radio1's Essential Mix, a weekly electronic music radio show hosted by Pete Tong